{
  "type": "FeatureCollection",
  "features": [
    {
      "type": "Feature",
      "properties": {},
      "geometry": {
        "type": "Point",
        "coordinates": [
          22.7103949,
          89.0827232,
       
       ]
      }
    }
  ]
}Satkhira Government College is a government college in Satkhira, Bangladesh. This college has 16 department, 17 stuff and 2 student hostel.

Available courses

Graduation courses-

Bangla

English

Economics

Political science

Philosophy

History

Islamic studies

Mathematics

Physics

Chemistry

Botany

Zoology

Geography

Environmental science

Management

Accounting

Post-Graduation courses-

Economics

Bangla

History

Islamic studies

Management

Accounting

Other facilities

Number of Boys Hostel : 02

Number of Girlss Hostel : 01 (Under Construction)

Computer Lab: 02

Digital Multimedia Class room: 16

Number of Books in Central Library: 30000+

Number of Books in seminar library: 16000+

Notable alumni
 Pori Moni, actress
 Hasan Foez Siddique, Chief Justice of Bangladesh

References
http://www.nubd.info/college/college.php?code=0201

Colleges affiliated to National University, Bangladesh
Universities and colleges in Bangladesh
Educational institutions of Khulna Division